Andrew Powell (born 23 August 1981) is a Welsh former rugby union player, who last played for Merthyr RFC. He is a former international rugby union player having played for both the Wales sevens team, and the Wales national rugby union team as well as touring with the British and Irish Lions (uncapped). His regular rugby union position was either No. 8 or blindside flanker in the back row.

As of 2021, he is coaching Southwell Rugby Club, who play in Midlands 2 East (North).

Rugby union career
Born in Brecon, Powell attended Llandovery College, and played as an amateur for both Llandovery and in Halifax. In 1999, he joined Newport RFC, and over the following four seasons he played in fifty matches, scoring eleven tries. Mentored by South African Ian McIntosh, he made the Wales Under-21 squad. He then joined Leicester Tigers, before returning to Wales via French club AS Béziers Hérault with the Llanelli Scarlets.

Cardiff Blues: 2005–2010
Powell joined the Cardiff Blues in the summer of 2005, making an impact in his first season, winning a number of man of the match awards. The 2006/07 season was an exceptionally unlucky one for Powell, who injured his left shoulder in a pre-season friendly against Bristol. The injury required total shoulder reconstruction and he returned to action at the beginning of April 2007. Three games in to his comeback, he suffered an identical injury to his right shoulder, which would also require reconstruction. In December 2009, Powell was one of only three British players to be selected for the Barbarians, in their encounter with New Zealand.

Wasps: 2010–2011
In July 2010, Blues agreed to release Powell from his contract, even though it had 12 months remaining, stating that Powell had "lost his way" since the buggy incident. Early speculation linked Powell with newly promoted French rugby union team SU Agen, and with Welsh Rugby league club Crusaders. But Powell joined London Wasps on a 12-month contract in July 2010, coached by Wales defence coach Shaun Edwards, which he hoped would improve his chances of a return to the national squad. On 5 May 2011, Powell left London Wasps by mutual consent after a drunken brawl outside a pub.

Sale Sharks: 2011–2013
In May 2011, Powell signed for Sale Sharks after his release by London Wasps. In October 2012, Sale fined him £5,000 for abusive language and making offensive hand gestures to spectators.

Wigan Warriors: 2013–2014
In 2013, he joined Wigan Warriors.

Newport Gwent Dragons: 2014–2015 
In June 2014, it was announced that Powell had signed a deal with Newport Gwent Dragons.

Merthyr: 2015– 2016 
In July 2015 Powell joined Merthyr RFC.

In October 2016, Merthyr announced Powell had retired from the game with immediate affect, after a re-occurring Knee injury.

Powell later revealed he had been suffering depression, and cites the condition as a reason for his retirement.

International
Powell played his first cap for Wales against South Africa on 8 November 2008 where he won Man of the Match in the 15 – 20 loss.

On 21 April 2009, Powell was named as a member of the British and Irish Lions for the 2009 tour to South Africa.

Golf buggy incident
Powell was arrested "for taking and driving away a golf buggy" a few hours after the Welsh team's last-minute victory over Scotland in their 2010 Six Nations match. He was arrested near Junction 33 on the M4 motorway at 0600 GMT 14 February 2010. 
The following day, for behaviour "contrary to the squad's code of conduct", he was removed from Wales' 35-man training squad for the Six Nations 2010, and played no further part in the tournament. He was later given a 15-month driving ban and fined after admitting the offence at Cardiff Magistrates' Court.

International tries

Rugby league
Welsh Super League club Crusaders made an approach to sign Powell in 2010, but the offer was rejected. Powell's then agent Mike Burton stated that Powell had a year left on his contract with Cardiff and that he would be honouring it, but Powell then parted company with Burton.

Powell has stated that he is interested in switching to rugby league and played during his teenage years with amateur club Cardiff Demons. The Crusaders were interested in signing him for the 2010 season although he stated he would be interested playing in the next year or two and still had ambitions to represent Wales in rugby union. Powell's new agent Emanuele Palladino confirmed that Powell would not be joining the Crusaders but he remained a target for Super League clubs. After being sacked by Wasps he again received interest from Crusaders to join them after the 2011 Rugby Union World Cup.

In April 2013 Powell confirmed he would join Wigan Warriors at the end of the 2012–13 rugby union season. He scored his first try for Wigan Warriors in the home match v Hull FC on 30 August 2013.

Personal information
Powell married Natasha Gascoine on 25 May 2013 in Llantrisant.

Notes

External links
ESPN Profile
(archived by web.archive.org) Wales profile

1981 births
Living people
Barbarian F.C. players
Brecon RFC players
British & Irish Lions rugby union players from Wales
Cardiff Demons players
Cardiff Rugby players
Dragons RFC players
Leicester Tigers players
Merthyr RFC players
Newport RFC players
People educated at Llandovery College
Rugby league players from Powys
Rugby union flankers
Rugby union number eights
Rugby union players from Brecon
Sale Sharks players
Wales international rugby union players
Wasps RFC players
Welsh rugby league players
Welsh rugby union players
Wigan Warriors players